Events in the year 1906 in Iceland.

Incumbents 
 Monarch: Christian IX (until 29 January 1906); Frederick VIII onwards
 Prime Minister: Hannes Þórður Pétursson Hafstein

Events 

 A submarine telegraph cable was laid by the Great Northern Telegraph Co. from Scotland through the Faroe Islands to Iceland, where it came ashore on the east coast at Seyðisfjörður. In conjunction a telegraph and telephone line, was laid from the landing point to the capital city Reykjavík. This established Síminn (originally Landssími Íslands).
 Þorvaldur Thoroddsen published a map of Iceland based on his own research.

References 

 
1900s in Iceland
Years of the 20th century in Iceland
Iceland
Iceland